Chen Pingyuan is professor of Chinese Literature at Peking University. His major works include "The Literati's Chivalric Dreams" (1991) and "The Establishment of Modern Scholarship in China" (1998). An interview with him appears in the book One China, Many Paths.

References

Living people
People from Chaozhou
Year of birth missing (living people)
Academic staff of Peking University
Place of birth missing (living people)
20th-century Chinese people